Pseudocalotes poilani, the Laotian false bloodsucker, is a species of agamid lizard. It is found in Laos

References

Pseudocalotes
Reptiles of Laos
Reptiles described in 1939
Taxa named by René Léon Bourret